Mariam Desamparados Ramón Climent (born 26 August 1976) is a retired Spanish female tennis player.

Ramón Climent won six singles and six doubles titles on the ITF Women's Circuit during her career, and on 20 September 1999, she reached a singles ranking-high of world No. 124. On 3 May 1999, she peaked at No. 120 in the doubles rankings.

She also played in the 1999 Australian Open and French Open doubles events, and lost in the first round of each.

Ramon Climent retired from pro tennis 2004.

ITF Circuit finals

Singles: 10 (6–4)

Doubles: 14 (6–8)

References

External links
 
 

Living people
1976 births
Spanish female tennis players